Guevaria alvaroi is a species of flowering plant in the family Asteraceae. It is found only in Ecuador. Its natural habitat is subtropical or tropical moist montane forests. It is threatened by habitat loss.

References

alvaroi
Flora of Ecuador
Vulnerable plants
Plants described in 1974
Taxonomy articles created by Polbot